Susheela Laxman Bangaru (14 March 1948 – 3 March 2018) was an Indian politician. She was a member of Lok Sabha from 2004 to 2009, elected from Jalore constituency in Rajasthan as a candidate of Bharatiya Janata Party. She was the wife of politician Bangaru Laxman.

References

External links
 Official biographical sketch in Parliament of India website

India MPs 2004–2009
Bharatiya Janata Party politicians from Rajasthan
Women in Rajasthan politics
People from Jalore district
1948 births
2018 deaths
Politicians from Jhansi
Sirohi district
Lok Sabha members from Rajasthan
21st-century Indian women politicians
21st-century Indian politicians
Women members of the Lok Sabha